Carlow Borough may refer to:

 Carlow Borough (Parliament of Ireland constituency), a constituency at the Irish House of Commons from 1613 to 1800
 Carlow Borough (UK Parliament constituency), a constituency at the UK House of Commons from 1801 to 1885

Politics of County Carlow